Chaitra Ambadipudi is an Indian playback singer from Hyderabad, India. She predominantly sang for Telugu, Tamil, Kannada, Malayalam, and Hindi language movies.

Early life and childhood 
Chaitra informally began learning music at the age of 10, where her parents Ramana Murthy and Padma Priya, although not professionally trained themselves, taught her what they observed from listening to music. The informal syllabus consisted of over 200 Indian film songs from the 1950s and 1960s, which are deeply rooted in Indian Classical Music. Eventually, Chaitra learnt Hindustani Classical Music from Smt. Geeta Hedge in Bangalore, India.

Career 
In 2004, at the age of 12, Chaitra began her playback singing career by recording her first Telugu playback song, Toli Toliga, for the movie Andaru Dongale Dorikithe, composed by the late Sri. Chakri.

In 2005, Chaitra won the Paadalani Undi singing show that aired on MAA TV that was hosted by the late  S P Balasubrahmanyam.

Discography

References 

Year of birth missing (living people)
Living people
Indian women playback singers
People from Hyderabad, India
Telugu playback singers
Tamil playback singers
Kannada playback singers
Malayalam playback singers